This is a list of the French SNEP Top 100 Singles and Top 150 Albums number-ones of 2001.

Number-one by week

Singles Chart

Albums Chart

Top Ten Best Sales 

This is the ten best-selling singles and albums in 2001.

Singles

Albums

See also
2001 in music
List of number-one hits (France)
List of artists who reached number one on the French Singles Chart

References

2001 in French music
2001 record charts
Lists of number-one songs in France